JWS may refer to:
 Jackson–Weiss syndrome
 Java Web Start
 Java Web Services Development Pack
 John Wesley Shipp, American actor
 John Woolman School, in Nevada City, California
 Journal of Web Semantics
 JSON Web Signature
 Whitfords railway station, in Western Australia

See also 
 Jehovah's Witnesses